Perfect shuffle may refer to:
 Faro shuffle, in particular the interpretation whereby cards (or more generally, entities in sequence) are divided into two equal piles and interleaved.
 Any shuffling algorithm that guarantees perfect randomness (all possible orders with equal probability), such as the Fisher–Yates shuffle.

Card game terminology
Card shuffling